The Narew (or ; Sudovian: Naura; Old German: Nare) is a 499-kilometre (310 mi) river primarily in north-eastern Poland, which is also a tributary of the river Vistula. The Narew is one of Europe's few braided rivers, the term relating to the twisted channels resembling braided hair. Around 57 kilometres (35 mi) of the river flows through western Belarus.

Etymology
The name of the river is from a Proto-Indo-European root *nr primarily associated with water (compare Neretva, Neris, Ner and Nur) or from a Lithuanian language verb nerti associated primarily with diving and flood.

Name of the lower portion
The portion of the river between the junctions with the Western Bug and the Vistula is also known as the Bugonarew, Narwio-Bug, Narwo-Bug, Bugo-Narew, Narwiobug or Narwobug. At the confluence near Zegrze the Bug is 1.6x longer, drains a 1.4x larger basin, and has a slightly greater average discharge (158 m³/s at Wyszków vs 146 m³/s at Pułtusk for the Narew, both ~25 km above the junction). Thus the Bugonarew was often considered part of the Bug river and the Narew a right tributary of the Bug.

On December 27, 1962, Prime Minister Józef Cyrankiewicz abolished the name Bugonarew soon after the Zegrze Reservoir had been constructed. Since then the river Bug has been considered officially part of the river Narew's system, with the Bug being a left tributary of the Narew (by this classification, the River Narew is a right tributary of the River Vistula). The name Bugonarew however is still used, especially by the inhabitants of local towns, such as Pułtusk.

Geography
The Narew flows through the geographical region of Europe known as the Wysoczyzny Podlasko – Bialoruskie (English: Plateau of Podlasie and Belarus) located within the Podlaskie Voivodeship and Masovian Voivodeship of Poland and the Hrodna Voblast of Belarus.

The Narew is the fifth longest Polish river.

Cities and towns

Tributaries

History 
On August 23, 1939, the Soviet Union and Germany signed the Molotov–Ribbentrop Pact, agreeing to divide Poland along the Narew, Vistula (Wisła), and San rivers.

On September 6, 1939, Polish military forces attempted to use the Narew as a defense line against German attack during the German invasion of Poland. This was abandoned the next day in favor of the Bug as German forces had already penetrated the defenses.

The Battle of Wizna was fought along the banks of the river between September 7 and September 10, 1939, between the forces of Poland and Germany during the initial stages of Invasion of Poland. Because it consisted of a small force holding a piece of fortified territory against a vastly larger invasion for three days at great cost before being annihilated with no known survivors, Wizna is sometimes referred to as a Polish Thermopylae in Polish culture.

On September 17, 1939, the USSR invaded Poland.  By 28 September, the Soviet Army had reached the line of the rivers Narew, Bug River, Vistula and San – completing the division of Poland as negotiated in advance.

See also 

 Narew National Park
 Narew Landscape Park
 Rivers of Poland
 Geography of Poland

References

External links 
 Natural tourism (birdwatching) in Narew National Park

Rivers of Poland
 
Rivers of Grodno Region
Rivers of Podlaskie Voivodeship
Rivers of Masovian Voivodeship
International rivers of Europe
Rivers of Belarus